Coptobasoides is a genus of moths of the family Crambidae.

Species
Coptobasoides comoralis Viette, 1960
Coptobasoides djadjoualis Viette, 1981
Coptobasoides latericalis Marion, 1955
Coptobasoides leopoldi Janse, 1935
Coptobasoides marionalis Viette, 1960
Coptobasoides ochristalis Marion, 1956
Coptobasoides pauliani Marion, 1955

Former species
Coptobasoides leucothyralis (Mabille, 1900)
Coptobasoides rubralis (Hampson, 1898)
Coptobasoides rubrifucalis (Mabille, 1900)

References

 Janse, 1935 . Mém. Mus. r. Hist. nat. Belg. (Hors Sér.) 4 (12) : 7.
 afromoths

Pyraustinae
Crambidae genera